Black piranha can refer to either of 2 species of these fish:

 Serrasalmus rhombeus (redeye piranha) which includes the fish formerly known as S. niger
 Serrasalmus spilopleura (speckled piranha)

Piranhas